Callous is an adjective that may pertain to:
 Callus, a toughened area of skin
 Indifference to suffering – see cruelty
 Callous and unemotional traits